Sylhet Strikers (Sylheti/) is a professional cricket franchise team based in Sylhet, Bangladesh. The team competes in the Bangladesh Premier League. The franchise made their debut at the 2012 Bangladesh Premier League.

The team was owned by Sylhet Sports Limited in care of Bangladesh's former Finance Minister Abul Maal Abdul Muhith. His son, Shahed Muhith is the Chairman of team. The Sixers announced Waqar Younis as head coach and International Cricketer, David Warner as captain for the sixth edition of Bangladesh Premier League. Former Bangladesh National Cricket Team all-rounder Alok Kapali took over as captain after Warner's departure, due to injury.

On 16 November 2019, 24Bazar.biz was named as the sponsor of the team and it was renamed to Sylhet Thunder. The team changed ownership ahead of the 2021–22 Bangladesh Premier League. The team was rebranded as Sylhet Sunrisers after changing owners ahead of 2021–22 Bangladesh Premier League.

In September 2022, Future Sports Bangladesh acquired the ownership and renamed the team to Sylhet Strikers.

History

Sylhet Sixers is a new Franchisee, created in 2017, competing in Bangladesh Premier League, chaired by architect, social activist and IT Specialist Shahed Muhit. The team's management has extensive experience in sports team management. The management intends to use the team to bridge the gap between the cricket stars and passionate fans and engage the youth to divert their focus to wholesome sporting activities. Sylhet Sixers is the brainchild of a Bangladesh MP, Abul Maal Abdul Muhit. A management team composed of former cricketers, coaches, lawyers, business entrepreneurs formed to start the Sylhet Sixers. Mr. Maashed R. Abdullah and Mr. Yasir Obaid both textile entrepreneurs had joined the Sixers as managing director and CEO respectively.

Season overview

2017–18 

The Sylhet Franchise returned to BPL under the Sylhet Sixers banner. The team's icon player was Sabbir Rahman and was captained by all-rounder Nasir Hossain. They lured wicket-keeper Nurul Hasan and orthodox spinner and Taijul Islam as pre-draft signings. Their foreign player signings included Krishmar Santokie, Babar Azam, Liam Plunkett, Andre Fletcher, Upul Tharanga, Ross Whitely and more.

At the draft, pacer Abul Hasan was their first pick. Their first foreign pick was Lankan all-rounder Chaturanga de Silva. Their surprise picks were little-known, inexperienced Pakistani pacer Ghulam Mudassar, averaging more than 40 with the ball and picking up a solitary wicket in the 2 matches.

The team started their campaign with 4 wins in a row on their home turf. Andre Fletcher and Upul Tharanga turned out to be destructive at the top. Skipper Nasir Hossain bowled well so did Liam Plunkett. The Sixers suffered a series of injuries as the tournament went on. In the end, the Sixers finished fifth on the points table.

2018–19 

The Sixers decided to retain Sabbir Rahman, Nasir Hossain and Pakistani all-rounder Sohail Tanvir. They signed Bangladesh National Cricket Team opener and wicket-keeper Liton Das as their icon player. Outside the draft, they signed Australian batsman David Warner. They also signed English opening batsman Jason Roy, Nepali leg-spinner Sandeep Lamichhane, South African Imran Tahir, Wayne Parnell and Pakistani all-rounder Mohammad Nawaz.

At the draft, Sylhet signed the likes of Taskin Ahmed, Al-Amin Hossain, Afif Hossain and Alok Kapali from the domestic category. Their international signings from the draft included Nicholas Pooran,Mohammad Irfan, Andre Fletcher, Gulbadin Naib to name a few.

2019–20 
During the player's direct signing period, a Conflict of Interests aroused between BCB and all other franchise. Subsequently, in September 2019, BCB made some changes in rules and regulations for this season and eliminating all franchises, BCB took over the charge of the current BPL and decided to run this current tournament by the board itself and named the tournament as Bangabandhu BPL T20 2019 in order to pay homage to Sheikh Mujibur Rahman on his birth centenary. The team is owned and managed by BCB itself.

Current squad

Kit manufacturers and sponsors

References

Sport in Sylhet
Cricket clubs established in 2015
Sports clubs in Bangladesh
Bangladesh Premier League teams
Cricket in Sylhet
2015 establishments in Bangladesh
Organisations based in Sylhet